Ronnie Ignatius Theseira (17 May 1930 – 18 June 2022) was a founder of the Malaysian Fencing Masters Association and a Malaysian fencing Olympian. He competed in the individual foil, épée, and sabre events at the 1964 Summer Olympics.

References

External links
 

1930 births
2022 deaths
People from Malacca
Malaysian people of Kristang descent
Malaysian people of Indian descent
Malaysian male épée fencers
Olympic fencers of Malaysia
Fencers at the 1964 Summer Olympics
Fencers at the 1970 British Commonwealth Games
Commonwealth Games competitors for Malaysia
Malaysian male foil fencers
Malaysian male sabre fencers